Binapacryl was used as a miticide and fungicide. Chemically, it is an ester derivative of dinoseb.  Although binapacryl has low toxicity itself, it is readily metabolized to form dinoseb, which is highly toxic.

International trade in binapacryl is regulated by the Rotterdam Convention; it has been withdrawn as a pesticide, since products were highly toxic to mammals, fish and aquatic invertebrates.

References

Carboxylate esters
Obsolete pesticides
Nitrobenzenes
Alkene derivatives
Phenol esters